The Governor General's Award for English-language children's writing is a Canadian literary award that annually recognizes one Canadian writer for a children's book written in English. It is one of four children's book awards among the Governor General's Awards for Literary Merit, one each for writers and illustrators of English- and French-language books. The Governor General's Awards program is administered by the Canada Council.

In name, this award is part of the Governor General's Award program only from 1987 but there was a single award for "Juvenile" literature from 1949 to 1958, and the four present-day "Children's" awards were established in 1975 under a Canada Council name. In the event, the "Canada Council" and "Governor General's" awards have recognized writing in an English-language children's book every year from 1975.

Juvenile fiction

The oldest of now-14 annual Governor General's Awards for Literary Merit were inaugurated in 1936. One award for a "juvenile" book was introduced in 1949, and conferred every year to 1958. Throughout those ten years, the juvenile literature award was one of five in the program, all for English-language books.

1949: Richard S. Lambert, Franklin of the Arctic
1950: Donalda Dickie, The Great Adventure
1951: John F. Hayes, A Land Divided
1952: Marie McPhedran, Cargoes on the Great Lakes
1953: John F. Hayes, Rebels Ride at Night
1954: Marjorie Wilkins Campbell, The Nor'westers
1955: Kerry Wood, The Map-Maker
1956: Farley Mowat, Lost in the Barrens
1957: Kerry Wood, The Great Chief
1958: Edith L. Sharp, Nkwala

Two of the Governor General's Award-winning writers also won the Canadian Library Association award for children's book writing, recognizing the same book: Richard Lambert in 1949 and Farley Mowat in 1958. The CLA Book of the Year for Children Award was conferred six times during these ten years.

Canada Council Children's Literature Prize 

In 1975 the Canada Council established four annual prizes of $5000 for the year's best English- and French-language children's books by Canadian writers and illustrators. Those 
"Canada Council Children's Literature Prizes" were continued under the "Governor General's Awards" rubric from 1987, and continue today. Among them the English-language writing prize was awarded every year from 1975.

 1975: Bill Freeman, Shantymen of Cache Lake
 1976: Myra Paperny, The Wooden People
 1977: Jean Little, Listen for the Singing – sequel to From Anna (1972)
 1978: Kevin Major, Hold Fast
 1979: Barbara Smucker, Days of Terror
 1980: Christie Harris, The Trouble with Princesses, illus. Douglas Tait 
 1981: Monica Hughes, The Guardian of Isis – sequel to The Keeper of the Isis Light (1980)
 1982: Monica Hughes, Hunter in the Dark
 1983: Sean O'Huigin, The Ghost Horse of the Mounties
 1984: Jan Hudson, Sweetgrass
 1985: Cora Taylor, Julie
 1986: Janet Lunn, Shadow in Hawthorn Bay 

Three of the CCCLP-winning English-language writers also won the annual Canadian Library Association award for children's book writing, recognizing the same book. Their CLA Book of the Year for Children Awards are dated one year later: Kevin Major 1979, Cora Taylor 1986, and Janet Lunn 1987. The CLA Book of the Year was inaugurated in 1947 and has been awarded every year since 1963.

Two of the CCCLP-winning English-language writers also won the CLA Young Adult Book Award, recognizing the same book, namely Monica Hughes in 1983 and Janet Lunn in 1987. That is, Janet Lunn and Shadow in Hawthorn Bay (1986) won both the CLA awards for children's and young-adult books.

According to one WorldCat library record The Trouble With Princesses (McClelland & Stewart, 1980) "retells stories about Northwest Coast princesses and compares them with similar Old World princesses", . For their collaboration Christie Harris won the CCCLP prize for English-language writing and Douglas Tait won the CLA award for children's book illustration, the 1981 Amelia Frances Howard-Gibbon Illustrator's Award.

Children's literature (writing) 

Four books listed below, winners of the English-language writing award under the "Governor General's" name, were also named CLA Book of the Year for Children: Bedard 1991, Wynne-Jones 1994, Porter 2006, and Nielsen 2013. Four of them also won the CLA Young Adult Book Award: Wieler 1990, Johnston 1995, Wynne-Jones 1996, and Brooks 2003.

1980s

1990s

2000s

2010s

2020s

See also 

 Governor General's Award for English-language children's illustration
 Governor General's Award for French-language children's literature
 Governor General's Award for French-language children's illustration

References

Canadian children's literary awards
Children English
English
Awards established in 1949
1949 establishments in Canada
Awards disestablished in 1958
Awards established in 1987
1987 establishments in Canada
English-language literary awards